Georg Grasser (born 3 October 1990) is an Austrian footballer who plays as a defender for Lafnitz.

Career

In 2008, Grasser signed for the reserves of English Premier League side West Ham Ujited, where he said, "The transition was very tough for me at the beginning because I wasn't physically at the same level as the other players." In 2015, he signed for GAK in the Austrian third division, helping them achieve promotion to the Austrian second division.

References

External links
 
 

Austrian footballers
Living people
Expatriate footballers in England
1990 births
Association football defenders
Grazer AK players
DSV Leoben players
SV Allerheiligen players
SC Weiz players
SV Lafnitz players